Olympia-Einkaufszentrum is a U-Bahn station in Munich, serving the Olympia-Einkaufszentrum (OEZ), a shopping mall in the Olympiapark area of Moosach. It is the terminus of the U1 line of the Munich U-Bahn system. The U3 extension to Olympia-Einkaufszentrum opened on 28 October 2007.

See also
List of Munich U-Bahn stations

References

External links

Munich U-Bahn stations
Railway stations in Germany opened in 2007